Geophiloidea is a superfamily in the order Geophilomorpha and suborder Adesmata containing the families Zelanophilidae, Gonibregmatidae (including Eriphantidae and Neogeophilidae), and Geophilidae (including Aphilodontidae, Dignathodontidae, Linotaeniidae, Chilenophilinae, and Macronicophilidae). It's characterized by an epipharynx with a bilobate border separating the clypeal and the labral parts, hypopharynx with spines extending to most frontal and ventral parts, and mandibles with a single, pectinate lamella.

References 

Geophilomorpha
Arthropod superfamilies